Julien Delonglée (born 23 March 1983) is a French professional footballer who plays as a midfielder.

References

External links
 
 Julien Delonglée at foot-national.com

1983 births
Living people
People from Montfermeil
French footballers
Association football midfielders
AS Beauvais Oise players
US Orléans players
SO Romorantin players
Saint-Pryvé Saint-Hilaire FC players
FC Chartres players
C'Chartres Football players
Footballers from Seine-Saint-Denis
Championnat National players
Ligue 2 players
Championnat National 2 players